Trinafour is a village in Perth and Kinross, Scotland, approximately seventeen miles north-west of Pitlochry, its nearest town. It is located at the western edge of Glen Errochty.

References

External links

Trinafour at AboutBritain.com

Villages in Perth and Kinross